Carol Elizabeth Heiss Jenkins (born January 20, 1940) is an American former figure skater and actress. Competing in ladies' singles, she became the 1960 Olympic champion, the 1956 Olympic silver medalist, and a five-time World champion (1956–1960).

Career

Competitive
Heiss  started skating as a six-year-old in New York. She was coached by Pierre Brunet. She first came to national prominence in 1951, when she won the U.S. novice ladies' title, at age 11. She won the U.S. junior ladies' title in 1952 and then moved up to the senior level in 1953. From 1953 to 1956, she finished second to Tenley Albright at the national championships. She competed with a slashed Achilles' tendon at the 1954 U.S. Championships.

Heiss was named in the U.S. team to the 1956 Winter Olympics in Cortina d'Ampezzo, Italy. She won the silver medal, while Albright took the gold. However, at the following World Championships, in Garmisch-Partenkirchen, West Germany, Heiss defeated Albright for the title; it was the first of her five consecutive world titles.

After the 1956 Winter Olympics, Heiss had offers to turn professional and skate in ice shows. But her mother, Marie Heiss, was quite ill with cancer at the time, and before her death in October 1956, she asked Carol to win a gold medal for her. Between 1957 and 1960, Heiss dominated women's figure skating like nobody since Sonja Henie. She was the World and U.S. Champion each year, and at the 1960 Winter Olympics in Squaw Valley, California, Heiss captured the gold medal, being ranked first by all nine judges. She also took the Olympic Oath as representative of the organizing country to open the 1960 games. By winning the 1960 World Championships held after the Olympics, Heiss became one of three women to have won five consecutive World Championships. She then retired from competitive skating.

In 1953, Heiss became the first female skater to land a double Axel jump. One of her trademarks was performing a series of alternating clockwise and counterclockwise single Axels. She normally rotated her jumps clockwise and spins counterclockwise; it is much more common for skaters to do both in the same direction (usually counterclockwise).

Heiss was inducted into the World Figure Skating Hall of Fame and the United States Figure Skating Hall of Fame.

Post-competitive

Heiss played the female lead in the 1961 film Snow White and the Three Stooges. In the late 1970s, she began coaching several skaters in Lakewood, Ohio. Her former students include Timothy Goebel, Tonia Kwiatkowski and Miki Ando.

Personal life
Carol Heiss was born on January 20, 1940, in New York City, and grew up in Ozone Park, Queens. Her younger sister and brother, Nancy Heiss and Bruce Heiss, were also elite figure skating competitors. During the 1950s, the three skating Heiss siblings were featured in publications such as Life magazine.

During her run of world titles, Heiss attended New York University, graduating after the 1960 Winter Olympics. In 1961, she married American figure skater Hayes Alan Jenkins, who had won the 1956 Olympic gold medal. They have three children together.

Results

References

External links

 
 
 
  
 
 
  Interview of Carol Heiss Jenkins conducted by Dan Coughlin at Cleveland Public Library on January 29, 2015. (audio only)

1940 births
Living people
Sportspeople from Queens, New York
American female single skaters
American figure skating coaches
Figure skaters at the 1956 Winter Olympics
Figure skaters at the 1960 Winter Olympics
Olympic gold medalists for the United States in figure skating
Olympic silver medalists for the United States in figure skating
Actresses from Akron, Ohio
World Figure Skating Championships medalists
Medalists at the 1956 Winter Olympics
Medalists at the 1960 Winter Olympics
Female sports coaches
New York University alumni
Oath takers at the Olympic Games
People from Ozone Park, Queens
21st-century American women